The Awakening is the ninth album by rock singer Melissa Etheridge and her ninth studio album. It was released on September 25, 2007. The rock album conveys Etheridge's current autobiographical, religious and political perspectives. Etheridge made the album to convey parts of her story and journey along with her love for God. In the album's booklet, she included a letter to all who buy it starting with "Dear Friend".

The album debuted at number 13 on the U.S. Billboard 200 chart, selling nearly 48,000 copies in its first week. As of 2010, the album has tallied 167,000 copies in the United States alone, according to Nielsen SoundScan. This album was #20 on Rolling Stones list of the Top 50 Albums of 2007.

Track listing
All songs written by Melissa Etheridge.
"All There Is" – 1:03
"California" – 3:47
"An Unexpected Rain" – 6:56
"Message to Myself" – 3:25
"God Is in the People" – 1:58
"Map of the Stars" – 5:31
"Threesome" – 3:33
"All We Can Really Do" – 1:18
"I've Loved You Before" – 4:16
"A Simple Love" – 1:17
"Heroes and Friends" – 4:23
"Kingdom of Heaven" – 4:11
"Open Your Mind" – 5:13
"The Awakening: The Universe Listened" – 3:09
"The Awakening: Imagine That" – 3:00
"The Awakening: What Happens Tomorrow" – 6:18

Production
Produced By Melissa Etheridge & David N. Cole
Engineers: Jorge Costa & Jared Kvitka

Personnel
Melissa Etheridge – lead vocals, acoustic guitar, electric rhythm guitar
Philip Sayce – lead guitar, backing vocals
Mark Browne – bass guitar
Mauricio „Fritz“ Lewak – drums
Rami Jaffe – keyboards, backing vocals
Bernadette „Bernie“ Barlow – backing vocals
Lily Wilson – backing vocals

Charts

References

External links

2007 albums
Melissa Etheridge albums
Island Records albums
Albums produced by David N. Cole
Concept albums